Badak LNG, or formerly known as PT Badak Natural Gas Liquefaction or PT Badak NGL, is the largest liquefied natural gas (LNG) company in Indonesia and one of large LNG plants in the world. The company is located in Bontang, East Kalimantan, and has 8 process train (A - H) capable of producing 22.5 Million Metric Tonnes Per Annum (MTPA) of LNG. Badak LNG is one of the big contributors to GDP for both Bontang and Indonesia in petroleum and gas sector. Badak LNG is also one of LNG plants in Indonesia besides Arun LNG, Donggi Senoro LNG, and Tangguh LNG.

Etymology and Terms 
The word "Badak" is originated from Badak natural gas field in Samberah, Nilam and Mutiara fields in district of Muara Badak, East Kutai Regency; near Mahakam delta river.

There are several references to PT Badak NGL. Among them are "LNG Badak", "PT Badak NGL", "PT Badak NGL Co.", "Badak LNG".

 The term of "PT Badak NGL" is officially registered on the company deed and in the 1990 - 2000 era the word "co." Was often added which stands for "corporation". This terminology is always used in legal / legal activities, official, and related to contracts.
 The term of "LNG Badak" is more often used when a sports event that represents the name of the company, for example: Bontang LNG Badak Volleyball Team (BLB).
 Badak LNG is a new terminology popularized and listed in the new PT Badak NGL corporate identity. The mention of "Badak LNG" is considered more familiar in international because other companies use terminology with this format. The format of this terminology is often used when establishing contracts or 'agreements' with parties from abroad or internationally.

History

Discovery of LNG (1972-1974) 
The Badak LNG project began when Huffco (now Virginia Indonesia Company - VICO), an oil and gas contracting company with PSC at Pertamina, managed to find a giant natural gas reserve in the Muara Badak complex field (Samberah, Nilam and Mutiara fields), East Kalimantan in February 1972, after the discovery of similar giant natural gas reserves in the Arun field, Aceh by Exxon Mobil.

At that time the LNG business was not yet well known and there were only four LNG plants around the world with 3–4 years experience of operation. Although without prior experience in the LNG sector, Pertamina and Huffco agreed to develop an LNG project that could export large amounts of liquid natural gas. Pertamina, Mobil Oil, and Huffco Inc. trying to sell the project to two potential LNG consumers, potential funders, and potential partners around the world. The effort finally paid off with the agreement on the LNG sales contract to five Japanese companies: Chubu Electric Co., Kansai Electric Power Co., Kyushu Electric Power Co., Nippon Steel Corp. and Osaka Gas Co. Ltd., on December 5, 1973, known as "The 1973 Contract".

Establishment and development (1974-2000) 
On November 26, 1974, the company PT Badak NGL was established with its shareholders, Pertamina, VICO Indonesia and Japan Indonesia LNG Co., Ltd. (JILCO). These companies are collaborating to operate the Badak LNG plant. The company name is taken from the name of the area where the giant natural gas reserves were found.

Construction of the refinery began on November 26, 1974, and was completed 36 months later on July 5, 1977, with the construction of the first LNG train (train A). The first refinery was inaugurated on August 1, 1977, and the first shipment of LNG was carried out on August 9, 1977, to Senboku, Japan via the LNG Aquarius.

PT Badak also has 4 parallel pipelines measuring 36 inches and 42 inches which function to deliver natural gas from gas fields for LNG and LPG raw materials from previously having only a 36-inch pipeline in the company's initial standing. In addition, on the same track there is one 42-inch pipe owned by Pupuk Kalimantan Timur.

For 25 years, the Badak LNG plant which initially only had 2 trains, but now has 8 trains and is added with LPG producing facilities, along with the discovery of equally large natural gas reserves around Muara Badak. If it operates at full capacity, the Badak LNG refinery can produce an average of 140,000 tons of natural gas per day. The annual total natural gas production has been increased from 3.3 million tons of LNG per year in 1977 to more than 22 million tons of LNG and 1.2 million tons of LPG per year. LNG production in Badak NGL is one of the largest in the world.

Decrease in production (Since 2001) 
Since 2001, LNG production from Bontang has begun to decline. Of the 379 cargoes in 2001 it was 341 cargoes in 2005. The decline in production caused PT Badak to no longer be able to fulfill its commitment to the buyer's contract. In addition, the government's policy also reduces LNG exports from Bontang because the LNG is diverted to meet the supply of several domestic fertilizer factories. LPG production was forced to be stopped temporarily seeing the reduction in gas supply to PT Badak, starting from 2006.

LPG production, which had been stopped by PT Badak in 2006, began operations again in 2009 with a total production of 435,518 that year. However, LNG production has continued to decline since 2001 (the highest production in the history of PT Badak), despite a rise in 2007 and 2008. In 2009, LNG production was recorded at 17,375,053 tons.

According to some experts' estimates, based on data on natural gas availability that existed in early 2008, it is estimated that in 2010, PT Badak will operate with only 6 trains. But since 2011, Badak NGL still operate 4 train refineries.

Collaboration with Universities 

In 2011, Badak LNG formed a special team (task force) tasked with preparing a scholarship program in collaboration with a tertiary institution, the Jakarta State Polytechnic (PNJ). Badak LNG and the PNJ finally agreed to cooperate and produce a program called LNG Academy.

LNG Academy is motivated by a large number of experts in the field of liquefied natural gas in Indonesia and International, which is characterized by the construction of refineries owned by the Natural Gas company in the world, such as Statoil, Qatargas and others. This program is also one of Badak LNG's missions in sector of education for increase human development index in Indonesia. The facilities at LNG Academy are actually PT Badak NGL training section facilities that were previously used for training prospective employees and other training programs that have been converted to support all LNG Academy lecture activities.

In addition, Badak LNG also collaborates with various universities and tertiary educations. The company collaborate with Brawijaya University in education about enterprise resource planning in and research development in digitalization gas refinery. Gadjah Mada University also collaborate with Badak NGL in education about natural gas. The master cooperation class is held with the Bandung Institute of Technology for master's programs in mechanical engineering and business management. The middle class cooperation expert was conducted with the Samarinda State Polytechnic.

Development of New Business 
In the last decade. Badak LNG has developed many technologies related to natural gas. Through a new division formed, namely the Corporate Strategic Planning and Business Development (CSP & BD), Badak LNG began to share this experience through training, assistance to field operators, refinery "start-up" assistance, and technical assistance for domestic clients and international clients.

Domestic clients:

 Pertamina Gas
 Pertamina Gas Niaga
 Tangguh LNG
 Donggi-Senoro LNG

International clients:

 Angola LNG, Angola.
 Cameroon LNG, Cameroon.
 Mozambique LNG, Mozambique.
 Yemen LNG, Yemen.
 Mitsui Chemicals, Japan.
 Chiyoda, Japan
 Dominion Cove Point LNG, Maryland, United States.

Labor union 
There are three labor unions (SP) in PT Badak NGL namely SP-FPLB, SP-LNG and SP-BLB. There are also non-SP PT Badak NGL who do not join the three SPs:

 SP-FPLB is the dominant SP in PT Badak NGL. More than 80% of the employee of PT Badak NGL are members of this union. SP-FPLB is an SP registered in the Ministry of Manpower as SP which is officially the compiler of the Collective Labor Agreement (PKB) together with PT Badak NGL.
 SP-LNG is one of the labor unions at PT Badak NGL. The SP-LNG is an opposition SP from the SP-FPLB.
 SP-BLB is the newest labor union that formed in 2018 and also registered in Ministry of Manpower.
 Non-SP is a group of employee who are not included in the three SPs above. Non-SP is also recognized by PT Badak NGL and there are non-SP group leaders

Logo history

References

External links 

 PT Badak LNG official website
 Perusahaan Gas Nasional official website
 Bontang LNG Plant info by Hydrocarbons Technology

Companies based in Bontang
Energy companies established in 1974
Indonesian brands
Pertamina
Natural gas companies
Indonesian companies established in 1974
Bontang